A Fine Madness is a 1966 American Technicolor comedy film based on the 1964 novel by Elliott Baker that tells the story of Samson Shillitoe, a frustrated poet unable to finish a grand tome. It stars Sean Connery (in the midst of his James Bond roles), Joanne Woodward, Jean Seberg, Patrick O'Neal, and Clive Revill. It was directed by Irvin Kershner.

Plot
Samson Shillitoe (Sean Connery), a poet, lives in Greenwich Village area of New York City with Rhoda (Joanne Woodward), a waitress who stands by him through all his troubles.

When Samson cannot find the inspiration to finish his latest poem, he becomes belligerent and depressed. Samson is continually pursued by a debt collector after his late alimony payments to a previous wife; if Samson doesn't pay, he will be arrested. Samson eventually assaults a police detective who accompanies the debt collector.

Samson has other troubles when he loses his job as an office cleaner when he has sex with a secretary (Sue Ane Langdon) whilst his carpet cleaning machinery fills the office with soap suds. However, Samson does earn a $200 fee for doing a recital of his poetry to a woman's group that ends in disaster.

On Samson's behalf, but unknown to him, Rhoda seeks the help of psychiatrist Dr. West (Patrick O'Neal), who claims to be able to cure writer's block.

Rhoda gives Dr. West the $200 she collected for Samson's lecture to treat Samson for what she fears will become suicidal depression if he can't finish his poem. Dr. West reluctantly agrees to see him, and when Samson confronts the Doctor about the return of his money, West is fascinated by Shillitoe and persuades him to become a patient. In order for Samson to be away from the chaos of his life in the city that he might finish his poem, Dr. West arranges a stay for him in a sanitarium upstate.

Another doctor at the sanitarium, Dr. Menken (Clive Revill) is also interested in Samson, but for the purpose of experimenting on him with a new surgical technique to quell his violent temper. He persuades Rhoda to agree to the surgery. Dr. West and two other colleagues vehemently oppose such a procedure, as it is too close to a lobotomy to be safe.

Dr. West's wife, Lydia (Jean Seberg), is frustrated with their marriage. He is a popular TV guest for his pop psychiatric methods and views, and she sees very little of him. Eventually she runs into Samson at the sanitorium. Samson does not know she is married to Dr West but recalls her when she walked out of his women's club lecture. In his usual manner Samson immediately seduces her and the two have sex in a therapeutic bath. Dr. West, looking for Samson, secretly sees them in the tub.

When it comes time for the clinic senior staff to vote on allowing the surgical technique to be performed on Samson, Dr. West, having seen Samson with his wife, changes his vote, enabling Dr. Menken to go ahead. Lydia finds out about the surgery and rushes to stop it, but arrives just after it has been completed.

When Samson awakes from the surgery, at first his voice is so low and quiet he cannot be understood. As Dr. Menken leans in to listen, Samson throws a punch that lands the doctor on the floor. The operation has had no effect, and Samson returns to New York.

Rhoda quickly learns of his arrival, and rushes to rejoin him. Samson has finally been served with his subpoena, so he must pay his ex-wife or go to jail. Rhoda prevents him from pummeling the civil servant, until Lydia appears and pays him the amount owed.

Lydia informs Samson she is leaving Dr. West and hints that she would like to be with her new lover, Samson. Rhoda protests, as Samson invites her to come live with them both. Lydia, disgusted by the idea, becomes hysterical and rushes out, presumably never to speak to Samson again. Rhoda pleads with Samson as he goes charging off down the street, before informing him that she is pregnant. He accidentally punches her and the movie ends with him fighting off an angry mob of indignant spectators.

Cast
 Sean Connery as Samson Shillitoe
 Joanne Woodward as Rhoda
 Jean Seberg as Lydia West
 Patrick O'Neal as Dr. Oliver West
 Colleen Dewhurst as Dr. Vera Kropotkin
 Clive Revill as Dr. Menken
 Werner Peters as Dr. Vorbeck
 John Fiedler as Daniel K. Papp
 Kay Medford as Mrs. Fish
 Jackie Coogan as Mr. Fitzgerald
 Zohra Lampert as Mrs. Tupperman
 Sue Ane Langdon as Miss Walnicki
 Sorrell Booke as Leonard Tupperman
 Bibi Osterwald as Mrs. Fitzgerald
 Mabel Albertson as Chairwoman
 James Millhollin as Rollie Butter
 Richard S. Castellano as Arnold

Production
Jerome Hellman bought the film rights in May 1964.

See also
 List of American films of 1966

References

External links
 
 
 
 
 

1964 American novels
1966 films
1960s screwball comedy films
Adultery in films
American screwball comedy films
Films about psychiatry
Films about poets
Films based on American novels
Films directed by Irvin Kershner
Films scored by John Addison
Films set in New York City
Films shot in New York City
Warner Bros. films
1966 comedy films
1960s English-language films
1960s American films